Brandon Guadalupe Sartiaguín Godoy (born 21 February 2000) is a Mexican professional footballer who plays as a centre-back for Liga MX club Toluca.

Sartiaguín hails from Guadalupe Victoria, a town in San Blas Municipality, Nayarit. His older brother, Jorge, also played for Toluca.

On 13 September 2020, Sartiaguín scored his first professional goal in a 1–1 draw with América at Estadio Azteca. He was loaned out to Chihuahua in 2022 by new manager Ignacio Ambríz.

Career statistics

Club

References

External links
 
 
 
 

2000 births
Living people
Mexican footballers
Association football defenders
Liga MX players
Liga Premier de México players
Deportivo Toluca F.C. players
Chihuahua F.C. footballers
Footballers from Nayarit